Münchwilen Pflegeheim railway station is a railway station in the municipality of Münchwilen, in the Swiss canton of Thurgau. It is located on the  Frauenfeld–Wil line of Appenzell Railways.

Services 
 the following services stop at Münchwilen Pflegeheim:

References

External links 
 
 

Railway stations in the canton of Thurgau
Appenzell Railways stations